Arkady Ivanovich Chernyshev (March 16, 1914 – April 17, 1992) was a Soviet ice hockey, soccer and bandy player, who played in the Soviet Hockey League, also a coach for Dynamo Moscow and a distinguished coach for Soviet Union national ice hockey team.

Career 
Chernyshev served as Dynamo Moscow club coach from 1946 till 1974.

Dynamo Moscow winning the USSR Champion title in the seasons 1946/1947 and 1953/1954.

Second place in the seasons 1949/1950, 1950/1951, 1958/1959, 1959/1960, 1961/1962, 1962/1963, 1963/1964, 1970/1971, 1971/1972

Third place in the seasons 1947/1948, 1948/1949, 1951/1952, 1952/1953, 1954/1955, 1955/1956, 1956/1957, 1957/1958, 1965/1966, 1966/1967, 1967/1968, 1968/1969, 1973/1974

Soviet Cup of hockey:

Champions in the seasons 1952/1953 and 1971/1972

Runner-up in the seasons 1954/1955, 1955/1956, 1965/1966, 1968/1969, 1969/1970, 1973/1974

As USSR national team head coach 1954-1957, and 1962-1972 guiding the team to:

Eleven World Champion titles (1954, 1956, 1963, 1964, 1965, 1966, 1967, 1968, 1969, 1970, 1971)

Eleven Europe Champion titles (1958,1959,1960,1963,1964,1965,1966,1967,1968,1969,1970)

Four Olympic Champion titles (1956, 1964, 1968, 1972).

These achievements make Arkady Chernyshev the most successful coach in the history of international hockey.

Chernyshev was inducted into the Russian and Soviet Hockey Hall of Fame in 1948 and the IIHF Hall of Fame in 1999.

The Kontinental Hockey League, a Russian-based ice hockey league, has one of its four divisions named after Chernyshev.

The hockey part of VTB Arena stadium is also named after Chernyshev.

Honours 
Chernyshev won three USSR soccer Champion titles (1937, 1940, 1947), as well as five USSR Bandy Cup titles (1937, 1938, 1940, 1941, 1948).

References

External links 
 Russian and Soviet Hockey Hall of Fame bio

1914 births
1992 deaths
Soviet ice hockey players
Soviet ice hockey coaches
Footballers from Moscow
IIHF Hall of Fame inductees
Soviet footballers
Soviet bandy players
Soviet Union national ice hockey team coaches
FC Dynamo Moscow players
Soviet Top League players
FC Dinamo Minsk players
Association football defenders
Association football midfielders